Klementyevo is a rural locality (a selo) in Novoalexandrovskoye Rural Settlement, Suzdalsky District, Vladimir Oblast, Russia. The population was 512 as of 2010. There are 15 streets.

Geography 
Klementyevo is located 30 km southwest of Suzdal (the district's administrative centre) by road. Nikulskoye is the nearest rural locality.

References 

Rural localities in Suzdalsky District
Vladimirsky Uyezd